In probability theory and statistics, the term Markov property refers to the memoryless property of a stochastic process. It is named after the Russian mathematician  Andrey Markov. The term strong Markov property is similar to the Markov property, except that the meaning of "present" is defined in terms of a random variable known as a stopping time.

The term Markov assumption is used to describe a model where the Markov assumption is assumed to hold, such as a hidden Markov model.

A Markov random field extends this property to two or more dimensions or to random variables defined for an interconnected network of items. An example of a model for such a field is the Ising model.

A discrete-time stochastic process satisfying the Markov property is known as a Markov chain.

Introduction

A stochastic process has the Markov property if the conditional probability distribution of future states of the process (conditional on both past and present values) depends only upon the present state; that is, given the present, the future does not depend on the past. A process with this property is said to be Markov or Markovian and known as a Markov process. Two famous classes of Markov process are the Markov chain and the Brownian motion.

Note that there is a subtle, often overlooked and very important point that is often missed in the plain English statement of the definition. Namely that the statespace of the process is constant through time. The conditional description involves a fixed "bandwidth". For example, without this restriction we could augment any process to one which includes the complete history from a given initial condition and it would be made to be Markovian. But the state space would be of increasing dimensionality over time and does not meet the definition.

History

Definition

Let  be a probability space with a filtration , for some (totally ordered) index set ; and let  be a measurable space.

Alternative formulations

Alternatively, the Markov property can be formulated as follows.

for all  and  bounded and measurable.

Strong Markov property

Suppose that  is a stochastic process on a probability space  with natural filtration .

.

Then  is said to have the strong Markov property if, for each stopping time , conditional on the event , we have that for each ,  is independent of  given .

The strong Markov property implies the ordinary Markov property since by taking the stopping time , the ordinary Markov property can be deduced.

In forecasting
In the fields of predictive modelling and probabilistic forecasting, the Markov property is considered desirable since it may enable the  reasoning and resolution of the problem that otherwise would not be possible to be resolved because of its intractability. Such a model is known as a Markov model.

Examples
Assume that an urn contains two red balls and one green ball. One ball was drawn yesterday, one ball was drawn today, and the final ball will be drawn tomorrow. All of the draws are "without replacement".

Suppose you know that today's ball was red, but you have no information about yesterday's ball. The chance that tomorrow's ball will be red is 1/2. That's because the only two remaining outcomes for this random experiment are:

On the other hand, if you know that both today and yesterday's balls were red, then you are guaranteed to get a green ball tomorrow.

This discrepancy shows that the probability distribution for tomorrow's color depends not only on the present value, but is also affected by information about the past. This stochastic process of observed colors doesn't have the Markov property. Using the same experiment above, if sampling "without replacement" is changed to sampling "with replacement," the process of observed colors will have the Markov property.

An application of the Markov property in a generalized form is in Markov chain Monte Carlo computations in the context of Bayesian statistics.

See also
Causal Markov condition
Chapman–Kolmogorov equation
Hysteresis
Markov blanket
Markov chain
Markov decision process
Markov model

References 

Markov models
Markov processes